Isabella Clemmensen (born November 4, 1996 in Copenhagen) is a Danish female curler.

At the national level, she is a two-time Danish women's champion (2015, 2016) and a three-time junior champion (2013, 2014, 2015).

Teams

Personal life
Her older sister Charlotte is also a curler and Isabella's teammate.

References

External links

Video: 

Living people
1996 births
Sportspeople from Copenhagen
Danish female curlers
Danish curling champions